Multi-primary color (MPC) display is a display that can reproduce a wider gamut color than conventional displays. In addition to the standard RGB (Red Green and Blue) color subpixels, the technology utilizes additional colors, such as yellow, magenta and cyan, and thus increases the range of displayable colors that the human eye can see.

Sharp's Quattron is the brand name of an LCD color display technology that utilizes a yellow fourth color subpixel. It is used in Sharp's Aquos LCD TV product line, particularly in models with screens 40 inches across and larger.

References

External links
Aquos LCD TV (Sharp website)
Sharp LC46LE821E Review – Technical assessment of Quattron TV by David Mackenzie at HDTVtest
GENOA Color Technologies

Liquid crystal displays
Consumer electronics
Color depths
Color space